Inside a plant, the apoplast can mean the space outside of cell membranes, where material can diffuse freely; that is, the extracellular spaces.
Apoplast  can also refer especially to the continuum of cell walls of adjacent cells; fluid and material flows occurring there or in any extacellular space are called apoplastic flow or apoplastic transport.

The apoplastic route is one way by which water and solutes are transported and distributed to different places through tissues and organs; another way is symplastic flow.

To prevent uncontrolled leakage to unwanted places, in certain areas there are barriers to the apoplastic flow: 
in roots the Casparian strip has this function[clarification needed];  
On the outside of the skin of certain plant parts is a protective waxy film called plant cuticle to achieve this (protection against e.g. drying out, but also waterproofing against soaking).
Air bubbles occupying extracellular spaces can also hinder apoplastic transport. 
 
The apoplast is important for all the plant's interaction with its environment: 
The main carbon source (carbon dioxide) needs to be solubilized, which happens in the apoplast, before it diffuses through the cell wall (also called plasma membrane) into the cell's inner content (cytoplasm) (thereby then entering the symplastic possibility of flow) to be used (by the chloroplasts) for photosynthesis. 
In the roots, ions diffuse into the apoplast of the epidermis before diffusing into the symplast, or in some cases being taken up by specific ion channels, and being pulled by the plant's transpiration stream, which also occurs completely within the boundaries of the apoplast. 
Similarly, all gaseous molecules emitted and received by plants such as plant hormones and other pheromones must pass the apoplast. 
 
In nitrate poor soils, acidification of the apoplast increases cell wall extensibility and root growth rate. This is believed to be caused by a decrease in nitrate uptake (due to deficit in the soil medium) and supplanted with an increase in chloride uptake. H+ATPase increases the efflux of H+, thus acidifying the apoplast.[clarification needed - maybe better an extra chapter for this?]
 
 
The apoplast is a site for cell-to-cell communication. During local oxidative stress, hydrogen peroxide and superoxide anions can diffuse through the apoplast and transport a warning signal to neighbouring cells. In addition, a local alkalinization of the apoplast due to such stress can travel within minutes to the rest of the plant body via the xylem and trigger systemic acquired resistance. 
 
The apoplast also plays an important role in resistance to aluminium toxicity.
 
In addition to resistance to chemicals, the apoplast provides the rich environment for microorganisms endophytes which arises[??] the abiotic resistance of plants.[clarification needed]
 Exclusion of aluminium ions in[clarification needed: "EXclusion IN"??] the apoplast prevent toxic levels which inhibit shoot growth, reducing[?] crop yields.

History
The term apoplast was coined in 1930 by Münch in order to separate the "living" symplast from the "dead" apoplast.

Apoplastic transport
The apoplastic pathway is one of the two main pathways for water transport in plants, the other being symplastic pathway. 
In the root via the apoplast water and minerals flow in an upward direction to the xylem. 
 
The concentration of solutes transported through the apoplast in aboveground organs is established through a combination of import from the xylem, absorption by cells, and export by the phloem. 
 
Transport velocity is higher (transport is faster) in the apoplast than in the symplast. 
This method of transport also accounts for a higher proportion of water transport in plant tissues than does symplastic transport. 
 
The apoplastic pathway is also involved in passive exclusion.[clarification needed] Some of the ions that enter through the roots do not make it to the xylem. The ions are excluded by the cell walls (plasma membranes)[clarification needed: why would that hinder APOplastic flow?] of the endodermal cells.

Apoplastic colonization 
It is well known that the apoplast in plants’ tissues contains rich mineral nutrients, and it becomes the main factor for microorganisms to thrive at the apoplast. Even though there are apoplastic immunity systems, but there are pathogens that have effectors that can modulate the host immunity or suppress the immunity responses as known as effector-triggered susceptibility. Another factor that pathogens colonize the apoplastic space so frequent is because when they enter the plants from leaves, the first place they come across is the apoplastic space. Therefore, the apoplast is a popular biotic interface and also a reservoir for microbes. One of the common apoplastic disease appear in plants without restricted habitat or climate is black rot, caused by the gram-negative bacteria Xanthomonas campestris.

Entophytic bacteria can cause severe problems in agriculture in a way of inhibiting plant growth by alkalizing the apoplast with their volatiles. In especially, the rhizobacteria has been found that its major component of the volatiles are phytotoxic, it is identified as 2-phenylethanol. 2-phenylethanol can influence the regulation of WRKY18 which is a transcription factor that engages in multiple plant hormones, one of them is abscisic acid (ABA) hormone. 2-phyenlethanol modulates the sensitivity of ABA through WRKY18 and WRKY40, but WRKY18 is the central mediator of the pathway of triggering cell death and modulation of ABA sensitivity influenced by 2-phyenlethanol. Therefore, it results in the inhibition of root growth, and the plants have no capacity to grow without having the roots absorb nutrients in soils.

However, the microbial colonization in the apoplast is not always harmful to the plants, indeed, it can be beneficial to establish a symbiotic relationship with the host. One of the examples is the endophytic and phyllosphere microbes can indirectly promote plant growth and protect the plant from other pathogens by inducing salicylic acid (SA)and jasmonic acid (JA) signaling pathways, and they are both parts of the pathogen associated molecular patterns triggered immunity (PTI). The productions of SA and JA hormones also modulate the ABA signaling to be the components on the defense gene expression, and there are a lot more responses with the involvement of other hormones to respond to different biotic and abiotic stress. In the experiment performed by Romero et al., they inoculated the known entophytic bacteria, Xanthomonas into Canola, a plant that grows in multiple habitats, and it is found its apoplastic fluids that are 99% identity to another bacteria, Pseudomonas viridiflava, by performing 16S rRNA sequences with the Genebank and reference strains. They further used the markers on the SA-responsive transcriptional factor and other specific genes such as lipoxygenase 3 as marker genes for JA signaling and ABA signaling to perform quantitative reverse-transcription PCR. It has shown Xanthomonas only activates the related gene of SA pathway, in comparison, Pseudomonas viridiflava is able to trigger the genes of both SA and JA pathway, which suggest Pseudomonas viridiflava originally in Canola can stimulate PTI by the accumulation of both signaling pathway to inhibit the growth of Xanthomonas. In conclusion, the apoplast acts as a crucial role in plants, involving in all kinds of regulations of hormone and transportation of nutrients, so once it has been colonized, the effect it brings cannot be neglected.

See also

Symplast
Tonoplast
Vacuolar pathway

Notes
Apoplast was previously defined as "everything but the symplast, consisting of cell walls and spaces between cells in which water and solutes can move freely". However, since solutes can neither freely move through the air spaces between plant cells nor through the cuticle, this definition has been changed. When referring to "everything outside the plasma membrane", the term "extracellular space" is in use.
The word apoplasm is also in use with similar meaning as apoplast, although less common.

References

Footnotes
 .

Plant physiology
Plant anatomy